The 2005 Men's Hockey Junior World Cup was the eighth edition of the men's Hockey Junior World Cup, the quadrennial world championship for men's national under-21 national field hockey teams organized by the International Hockey Federation. It was held from 29 June to 10 July 2005 in Rotterdam, Netherlands.

Results
All times are local, CEST (UTC+2).

Preliminary round

Pool A

Pool B

Pool C

Pool D

Second round
Points obtained against qualified teams from the same group were carried over.

Pool E

Pool F

Thirteenth to sixteenth place classification

Pool G

Fifteenth and sixteenth place

Thirteenth and fourteenth place

Ninth to twelfth place classification

Cross-overs

Eleventh and twelfth place

Ninth and tenth place

Fifth to eighth place classification

Cross-overs

Seventh and eighth place

Fifth and sixth place

First to fourth place classification

Semi-finals

Third and fourth place

Final

Awards

Statistics

Final standings

Goalscorers

See also
 2005 Women's Hockey Junior World Cup

External links
Official FIH website

Hockey Junior World Cup
Junior World Cup
Hockey Junior World Cup
International field hockey competitions hosted by the Netherlands
Hockey Junior World Cup
Hockey Junior World Cup
Hockey World Cup
Sports competitions in Rotterdam
21st century in Rotterdam